Parasinilabeo maculatus is a species of cyprinid fish endemic to China.

References

Fish described in 2000
Parasinilabeo